Belvoir (and counterpart of fairview) may refer to:

France
Belvoir, Doubs, France, a commune
Belvoir Castle ( in French; 12th-17th century) in the commune

Israel
Belvoir Castle (Israel), a Crusader (Hospitaller) castle in the Jordan Valley
Battle of Belvoir Castle, a military campaign involving that castle
Belveer/Beauverium, a Crusader castle near Jerusalem: see Al-Qastal, Jerusalem

United Kingdom
Belvoir Park Golf Club, Belfast, Northern Ireland
HMS Belvoir, Royal Navy'' ships
Vale of Belvoir,  England
Belvoir, Leicestershire, a village in England
Belvoir Castle,  Belvoir village
Belvoir Priory,  near the castle
Belvoir Hunt, a fox hunt in the Vale of Belvoir
Belvoir High School,  in the Vale of Belvoir
Belvoir Rural District (1894–1935)

United States
Belvoir (Saffold Plantation), Alabama
Belvoir, Kansas, a ghost town
Belvoir (Crownsville, Maryland), a historic home
Belvoir Township, Pitt County, North Carolina
Belvoir, North Carolina, a community in the township
Belvoir (RTA Rapid Transit station),  Cleveland, Ohio
Belvoir (plantation), Virginia
Fort Belvoir, on the plantation site

Other places
Belvoir St Theatre, Sydney, Australia
Belvoir (theatre company)
Villa Belvoir and Belvoirpark, Zürich, Switzerland

See also
Beauvais (disambiguation)
Beauvoir (disambiguation)